, also transcribed Embun, was a Japanese era name (年号, nengō, lit. year name) of the Northern Court during the Era of Northern and Southern Courts after Bunna and before Kōan. Go-Kōgon's Southern Court rival in Yoshino during this time-frame was

Nanboku-chō overview
   
During the Meiji period, an Imperial decree dated March 3, 1911 established that the legitimate reigning monarchs of this period were the direct descendants of Emperor Go-Daigo through Emperor Go-Murakami, whose  had been established in exile in Yoshino, near Nara.

Until the end of the Edo period, the militarily superior pretender-Emperors supported by the Ashikaga shogunate had been mistakenly incorporated in Imperial chronologies despite undisputed recognition that the Imperial Regalia were not in their possession.

This illegitimate  had been established in Kyoto by Ashikaga Takauji.

Change of era
 1356, also called : The new era name was created to mark an event or series of events. The previous era ended and the new one commenced in Bunna 5.

In this time frame, Shōhei (1346–1370) was the Southern Court equivalent nengō.

Events of the Enbun era 
 1356 (Enbun 1, 7th month): Minamoto no Michisuke was advanced from the court rank of dainagon to naidaijin.
 1356 (Enbun 1, 7th month): Ashikaga Yoshinori is raised to the second rank of the third class in the court hierarchy.
 1357 (Enbun 2, 2nd month): Emperor Go-Murakami, who had captured former-Emperor Kōgon, former-Emperor Kōmyō and former-Emperor Sukō in 1352, released all three of them and permitted their return from Yoshino to Kyoto.
 1358 (Enbun 3): Death of Ashikaga Takauji; Ashikaga Yoshiakira appointed shōgun; dissention and defections in shogunate.<ref>Ackroyd, Joyce. (1982) Lessons from History: The Tokushi Yoron, p.329.</ref>

Notes

References
 Ackroyd, Joyce. (1982) Lessons from History: The Tokushi Yoron. Brisbane: University of Queensland Press. 
 Mehl, Margaret. (1997). History and the State in Nineteenth-Century Japan. New York: St Martin's Press. ; OCLC 419870136
 Nussbaum, Louis Frédéric and Käthe Roth. (2005). Japan Encyclopedia. Cambridge: Harvard University Press. ; OCLC 48943301
 Thomas, Julia Adeney. (2001). Reconfiguring Modernity: Concepts of Nature in Japanese Political Ideology. Berkeley: University of California Press. ; 
 Titsingh, Isaac. (1834). Nihon Odai Ichiran''; ou,  Annales des empereurs du Japon.  Paris: Royal Asiatic Society, Oriental Translation Fund of Great Britain and Ireland. OCLC 5850691

External links
 National Diet Library, "The Japanese Calendar" -- historical overview plus illustrative images from library's collection

Japanese eras
1350s in Japan
1360s in Japan